The 2002–03 season saw Partick Thistle compete in the Scottish Premier League where they finished in 10th position with 35 points.

Final league table

Results
Partick Thistle's score comes first

Legend

Scottish Premier League

Scottish Cup

Scottish League Cup

References

External links
 Partick Thistle 2002–03 at Soccerbase.com (select relevant season from dropdown list)

Partick Thistle F.C. seasons
Partick Thistle